"A Day Without Love" is a song by British band the Love Affair, released as their fourth single in August 1968. It continued the band's success, becoming their third consecutive top-ten hit in the UK.

Reception
Reviewing the song for New Musical Express, Derek Johnson wrote "I think the Love Affair have done it again! Certainly the group has acquired the happy knack of turning out wholesome pop records with a strong commercial appeal and this disc maintains the standard". He also described it as "a stimulating, up-beat number that storms along at a dynamic pace, and exudes a terrific atmosphere of vitality". Peter Jones for Record Mirror wrote that "it could be their strongest yet", describing it as "a good and commercial song, with a rather romantic, but tough, edge to it".

Personnel
 Steve Ellis – lead vocals
 Big Jim Sullivan – guitar
 Herbie Flowers – bass
 Clem Cattini – drums
 Lesley Duncan – backing vocals
 Sue Glover – backing vocals
 Sunny Leslie – backing vocals

Charts

References

1968 songs
1968 singles
CBS Records singles
Love Affair (band) songs
Song recordings produced by Mike Smith (British record producer)